The Op. 67 mazurkas by Frédéric Chopin are a set of four mazurkas composed between 1835 and 1849 which were posthumously published in 1855.  A typical performance of all four mazurkas lasts around seven minutes.

Mazurka in G major, Op. 67, No. 1 (1835)
Mazurka in G Minor, Op. 67, No. 2 (1849, often regarded as one of Chopin's last compositions, along with the Mazurka in F minor, Op. 68, No. 4)

The mazurka in G minor is composed in the last year of Chopin’s life, and it appeared in ABRSM grade 6 syllabus from 2021-2022

Mazurka in C major, Op. 67, No. 3 (1835)
Mazurka in A minor, Op. 67, No. 4 (1846, one of Chopin's more popular mazurkas)

References

External links 

Mazurkas by Frédéric Chopin
Compositions by Frédéric Chopin published posthumously
Music with dedications